Yemima Avidar-Tchernovitz (October 8, 1909 – March 20, 1998) was an Israeli author whose works became classics of modern Hebrew children’s literature. Born in Vilna, Lithuania, in 1909, she arrived in Palestine in 1921, at the age of 12.

A teacher and school principal, she also worked in children's radio with Kol Yerushalayim, with the Nursery School Teachers’ Theater and on the editorial board of Dvar HaPo’elet. One of her most famous pupils was the actor Chaim Topol. Her books for children are foundational in the sippurei havurah (band-of-friends) genre and were among the earliest based on the ordinary lives of children. In addition to her original works, she translated other works into Hebrew.

Among her honors are the Israel Prize for children's literature (1984) and the Yakir Yerushalaim award (1992).

Publications
Source:

Books published in Hebrew

 Stories for Rama (Sipurim Le-Rama), Stybel, 1936
Daliah, Hatkufah, 1940
Naughty Muki (Muki HaShovav), Massada, 1943
Awake Spring (Ura Ma`ayan), Yavne, 1943
The Swallow Tells Me (HaSnunit Mesaperet), Massada, 1944
Eight in Pursuit of One (Shmonah BeIkvot Ehad), Twersky, 1945; Keter, 1996
He Will Bring Them (Hu Yavi Otam), Twersky, 1945
A Pair of Shoes (Zug Na`alaim), Twersky, 1945
Grandpa Moon (Saba Yareah), Yavne, 1945
One of Ours (Ehad MiShelanu), Twersky, 1947
Kindergarten Songs (Gan Gani Alef, Three volumes, with Levin Kipnis), Twersky, 1947–1952
The Toys` Visit (Bikur HaTza`atzuim), Massada, 1949
Two Friends on the Road (Shnei Re`im Yatzu LaDerech), Twersky, 1950
The Magic Chain (Sharsheret HaKesamim), Newmann, 1952
The Winding Path (BaShvil HaMitpatel), Twersky, 1955
Kushi and Nushi, Massada, 1955[Kushi Ve- Nushi]
The Secret Circle (BeMa`agal HaStarim), Dvir Li- Yladim, 1955
Home (Habaita), Am Oved, 1960
Stories for Nivi (Sipurim LeNivi), Massada, 1962
Grandma's Dove (HaYonah Shel Savta), Massada, 1963
The Daughter (HaBat), Massada, 1966
Nunu, Twersky, 1967
Towers in Jerusalem (Migdalim B`Yerushalayim), Massada, 1968
Diligent Girls (Yeladot Harutzot), Yizre`el, 1968
Operation 52 (Mivtzah 52), Massada, 1971
Michali (Michali), Massada,1974
Really? (BeEmet?), Sifriat Poalim, 1978
Fire Chariot (Rechev Esh), Lichtenfeld-Bronfman, 1979
Tantan Comes to Visit (Tantan Ba LeHitareah), Massada, 1979
Muki is Angry with Mum (Muki BeRogez Al Ima), Massada, 1980
Grandma's Teddy Bear Goes North (Duby Shel Savta Yotze LaTzafon), Sifriat Poalim, 1982
Three Diligent Girls (Shalosh Yeladot Harutzot), Domino, 1983
Hello Grandma, It's Me Talking (Hallo Savta, Zo Ani Medaberet), Keter, 1984
Daddy's Paratrooper Boots (Na`alei HaTzanhanim Shel Aba), Lichtenfeld, 1984
Mommy I'm Bored! (Ima, Mesha`amem Li!), Keter, 1986
Grandma Wears Sportwear (Savta Be Training), Massada, 1988
You Will Not Leave Me at Home (Oti Lo tashiru BaBait), Keter, 1988
Little Fibs (Shkarim Ktanim), Keter, 1990
Who Kidnapped Boaz? (Mi Hataf Et Boaz?) Keter, 1992
Stories for Roee (Sipurim LeRoee), Keter, 1993
Yemima Avidar-Tchernovitz's Big Book (HaSefer HaGadol Shel Yemima Avidar-Tchernovitz), Am Oved, 1995
Grandma Left Through the Windows (Savta Yatza MeHaHalonot), Keter, 1997

Translated books 
Kindergarten Songs (Gan-Gani) – English: Tel Aviv, Twersky, 1957
The Daughter: The Diary of an Israeli Girl – English: Ramat Gan, Massada Press, 1969
Home! – Spanish: Buenos Aires, Editorial Israel, 1961
One of Our Own – Spanish: Buenos Aires, Editorial Israel, 1953
Two Friends on the Road – Russian: Jerusalem, Aliya, 1993

Personal life
She was married to the Haganah commander Yosef Avidar.

See also

List of Israel Prize recipients

References

Israeli children's writers
1909 births
1998 deaths
Writers from Vilnius
People from Vilensky Uyezd
Jews from the Russian Empire
Lithuanian Jews
Jews in Mandatory Palestine
Israel Prize women recipients
Israel Prize in children's literature recipients
Lithuanian emigrants to Mandatory Palestine
Israeli people of Lithuanian-Jewish descent
Israeli women children's writers
20th-century women writers
20th-century Lithuanian women writers
20th-century Lithuanian writers